Matteo Berrettini was the defending champion, but withdrew with an ankle injury before the tournament began.

Albert Ramos Viñolas won the title, defeating Cedrik-Marcel Stebe in the final, 6–3, 6–2.

Seeds
The top four seeds received a bye into the second round.

Draw

Finals

Top half

Bottom half

Qualifying

Seeds

Qualifiers

Qualifying draw

First qualifier

Second qualifier

Third qualifier

Fourth qualifier

References

External links
 Main draw
 Qualifying draw

2019 ATP Tour
2019 Singles